The International Skating Union has organised the World Sprint Speed Skating Championships for Women since 1970. The first two years (1970–1971), they were called the ISU Sprint Championships.

Medal winners

Sprint championships

Medal table

Team sprint

Medal table

Combined medal table

World champions (individual sprint)
As of 2022.

See also
 World Sprint Speed Skating Championships for Men
 World Allround Speed Skating Championships
 World Single Distances Speed Skating Championships

References

 
 

Sprint
Recurring sporting events established in 1970